The Regional Assemblies (Preparations) Act 2003 (c 10) was an Act of the Parliament of the United Kingdom.  Its core provision was to allow the Deputy Prime Minister to make orders for referendums in each of the Regions of England on the question of whether they wish to have an elected regional assembly.  If the answer was "yes", this would have been implemented by further legislation; and existing two-tier local government areas (shire counties) would have become unitary authorities.

Three such referendums (the Northern England referendums) were expected in 2004, for the regions of North East and North West England and Yorkshire and the Humber.  There were no immediate plans for any in the other 5 applicable regions (East of England, East Midlands, South East, South West, West Midlands).  Greater London already has the London Assembly.

It contained further consequential provisions, including causing the Boundary Committee for England to make recommendations about what the pattern of unitary authorities should be; and then if a referendum was successful, the composition of the Assemblies.  It was expected that the proposed assemblies would have had a similar level of representation to the London Assembly, which has 25 members, 14 of which represent constituencies, the remainder being apportioned on a top-up party list system.

Following the overwhelming defeat of the referendum in North East England, Deputy Prime Minister John Prescott told the House of Commons he would not move orders for the other two referendums within the effective time limit of June 2005 permitted by the Act. The Act was repealed by the Local Democracy, Economic Development and Construction Act 2009.

See also
2004 North East England devolution referendum
Referendums in the United Kingdom

References
Halsbury's Statutes,

Acts of the Parliament of the United Kingdom concerning England
 
United Kingdom Acts of Parliament 2003
2003 in England
Referendums in England